Orthopristis chrysoptera, the pigfish, hogfish, piggy perch, redmouth grunt or sailor's choice, is a species of marine ray-finned fish, a grunt belonging to the family Haemulidae. It is found in the western Atlantic Ocean. This name derives from the grunting or chattering noise these fish make by rubbing their pharyngeal teeth together.

Description 
Orthopristis chrysoptera has an elliptical, oval shaped, compressed  body with a thin-lipped small mouth which does not extend to the eye and is not coloured red inside. The jaws have a narrow band of thin teeth. The dorsal fin contains 12–13 spines and a similar number of soft rays while the anal fin has 3 spines and 12–13 soft rays, the second spine is slightly thicker and longer than the third. The entire body is clothed in scales apart from the tip of the snout, lips and chin. The overall colour of the body is pale bluish-grey on the back and silvery below. Every scale on the body has a blue centre and a bronze spot on the margin, creating diagonal orange-brown stripes running up an along the flanks and back. The stripes below the lateral line are horizontal. There are bronze spots on the head and the fines are a yellowish- bronze with dusky margins.

Distribution
Orthopristis chrysoptera is found in the western Atlantic Ocean. Its range extends from Massachusetts in the north south along the Atlantic coast of the United States around Florida and into the Gulf of Mexico, including the Yucatan Peninsula and Cuba. It is also found in Bermuda. It has been recorded off Siracusa in Sicily in 2020, probably afterbeing transported by ship.

Habitat and biology
Within these shallow waters they show a catholic habitat choice being found over soft substrates Seychelles as sand or silt, hard substrates including jetties, reefs and oil rigs, as well as shell banks. They may be found both in coastal waters and over the continental shelf.

The main spawning season is in the Spring and is extended, commencing in the late winter. It may occur offshore in open waters or in more sheltered situations inshore. The larger fish are the earliest spawners and all fish lose condition over the breeding season. Spawning takes place at dusk. They have a longevity of 4 years but most only attain 3 years of age.

Pigfish are predatory fish, emerging from shelters to feed at night. Their main prey is benthic invertebrates and prey size increases with the size of the fish. The younger fish feed mainly on planktonic crustaceans while the larger fish feed on polychaetes, larger crustaceans, molluscs and smaller fishes. They have been recorded eating insect larvae in brackish waters. Pigfish are migratory and move offshore to avoid cold temperatures but when they return inshore in Spring they are in poor conditions suggesting that the offshore food supply is of low quality. They also undertake shorter distance. Daily migrations to and from feeding areas and shelters.

The pigfish likely gets its common name from the chattering noises they create when they are captured. The pigfish creates this grunting noise by rubbing their pharyngeal teeth together, as do the other grunts. When feeding, pigfish use their throat teeth to grind up shellfish and small bits of other food.

Systematics
Orthopristis chrysoptera was first formally described as Perca chrysoptera in 1758 by Carolus Linnaeus with the type locality given as Carolina. It is now thought this means the Bahamas or South Carolina. When Charles Frédéric Gerard described Orthopristis duplex in 1858 he placed it in a new genus. This taxon was later shown to be a junior synonym of Linnaeus's P. chrysoptera, so this species is the type species of the genus Orthopristis. The specific name chrysoptera means "golden-finned." Linnaeus did not explain this, but it may refer to the row of bronze spots on the dorsal fin or the yellowish paired fins.

Utilisation
Orthopristis chrysoptera is caught using hook and line, traps and seines. The catch is not recorded separately for this species. The flesh is normally sold fresh. It is often caught to be used as bait in angling and commercial fisheries for other, larger fish such as the spotted sea trout (Cynoscion nebulosus).

References 

 Ohs, C.L., DiMaggio, M.A., Grabe, S.W. “Species Profile: Pigfish Orthopristis chrysoptera. Southern Regional Aquaculture Center, United States Department of Agriculture.

External links 
Texas parks and wildlife – Pigfish (Orthopristis chrysoptera)
Fishbase – Orthopristis chrysoptera
Florida Fish and Wildlife Conservation Commission – Pigfish

chrysoptera
Fish described in 1766
Taxa named by Carl Linnaeus